Ganj Kola may refer to:
 Ganj Kola-ye Bala
 Ganj Kola-ye Pain